The 2002–03 Rochdale A.F.C. season was the club's 82nd season in the Football League, and the 29th consecutive season in the fourth tier (League Division Three).

Statistics

|}

League Division Three

FA Cup

League Cup

League Trophy

References

Rochdale A.F.C. seasons
2002–03 Football League Third Division by team